At the End of Daybreak (Sum Moh) is a Malaysian-Hong Kong film released on 5 November 2009. It was directed and written by Ho Yuhang and has runtime of 94 minutes. The film had its world premiere in August 2009 at the 62nd Locarno International Film Festival where it won NETPAC Award.

Plot 
Tuck (Tsui Tin-Yau) is a 23-year-old Malaysian from a lower-class family, who lives with his divorced mother (Kara Hui) and generally lays about doing nothing. He dates Ying (Ng Meng-Hui), a 15-year-old schoolgirl whose quiet defiance defines her character.

Cast 
 Kara Hui
 Tien You Chui
 Yasmin Ahmad
 Azman Hassan
 Hassan Muthalib
 Meng Hui Ng

Awards 
 46th Golden Horse Awards - Kara Hui - Best supporting actress
 16th Hong Kong Film Critics Society Awards - Kara Hui - Best actress
 4th Asian Film Awards - Kara Hui - Best actress
 Best Newcomer - Jane Ng Meng Hui
 29th Hong Kong Film Awards - Kara Hui - Best actress
 10th Chinese Film Media Awards - Kara Hui - Best actress
 10th Changchun Film Festival- Kara Hui - Best actress
 Vladivostok International Film Festival - Kara Hui - Best actress
 2009 Locarno International Film Festival - NETPAC Award

Festival 
 2009 (62nd) Locarno International Film Festival - 5–15 August - International Competition
 2009 (34th) Toronto International Film Festival - 10–19 September - Contemporary World Cinema
 2009 (28th) Vancouver International Film Festival - 1–16 October - Dragons and Tigers
 2009 (14th) Busan International Film Festival - 8–16 October - A Window on Asian Cinema
 2009 (6th) Hong Kong Asian Film Festival - 15–30 October - Closing Film
 2009 (22nd) Tokyo International Film Festival - 17–25 October - Winds of Asia - Middle East
 2010 (39th) International Film Festival Rotterdam - 27 January – 7 February
 2010 (9th) Asian Film Festival of Dallas - 23–29 July 2010 *Southwest Premiere

References

External links 
 
 

2009 films
2000s Mandarin-language films
Malaysian crime drama films
Hong Kong crime drama films
2000s Hong Kong films